Don Mecklem (11 May 1926 – 15 March 2018) was an Australian field hockey player. He competed in the men's tournament at the 1956 Summer Olympics.

References

External links
 

1926 births
2018 deaths
Australian male field hockey players
Olympic field hockey players of Australia
Field hockey players at the 1956 Summer Olympics
Place of birth missing